| highest attendance  = 25,849(Leicester Tigers v Northampton Saints)
| lowest attendance   = 1,370(Cardiff v Worcester Warriors)
| tries               = 
| top point scorer    =  Freddie Burns(Leicester Tigers) 64
| top try scorer      =  Josh Adams(Worcester Warriors) 6
| venue               = Twickenham Stoop 
| attendance2         = 
| champions           = Leicester Tigers
| count               = 8
| runner-up           = Exeter Chiefs
| website             = 
| previous year       = 2014–15
| previous tournament = 2014–15 LV Cup
| next year           = 2017–18
| next tournament     = 2017–18 Anglo-Welsh Cup
}}

The 2016–17 Anglo-Welsh Cup was the 45th season of England's national rugby union cup competition, and the 11th to follow the Anglo-Welsh Cup format. The competition returned after a one-year hiatus due to being dropped due to the 2015 Rugby World Cup in England.

The competition consisted of the four Welsh Pro12 teams and the twelve English Premiership clubs arranged in pools of three English and one Welsh team. English clubs were allocated to the pools depending on their final positions in the 2015–16 Aviva Premiership. Teams played two home and two away pool matches, with teams in Pools 1 and 4 playing each other and teams in Pools 2 and 3 playing each other. The top team from each pool qualified for the semi-finals. The competition took place during the Autumn International window and during the Six Nations.

Saracens were defending champions after claiming the cup with a 23–20 victory over Exeter Chiefs in the 2014–15 final at Franklin's Gardens in Northampton. This was Saracens second title in the competition. The 2016–17 Anglo-Welsh Cup was won by Leicester Tigers who won their eighth cup title by defeating Exeter Chiefs 16–12 in the final held at Twickenham Stoop. Freddie Burns had an excellent tournament for the Tigers, scoring 64 points overall including 11 in the final, to finish as the competition's top point scorer, while Josh Adams was top try scorer with 6 tries from only 2 games for Worcester Warriors.

Teams & locations

Pool stages
Points system
The points scoring system for the pool stages will be as follows:
 4 points for a win
 2 points for a draw
 1 bonus point for scoring four or more tries in a match (TB)
 1 bonus point for a loss by seven points or less (LB)

Pool 1 v Pool 4

Round 1 (England)

Round 2

Round 1 (Wales)

Round 3

Round 4

Pool 2 v Pool 3

Round 1 (England)

Round 2

Round 1 (Wales)

Round 3

Round 4

Semi-finals

Final

Attendances
 Attendances do not include the final at Twickenham Stoop.

Individual statistics
 Note that points scorers includes tries as well as conversions, penalties and drop goals. Appearance figures also include coming on as substitutes (unused substitutes not included).

Top points scorers

Top try scorers

Season records

Team
Largest home win — 52 points
62-10 Wasps at home to Worcester Warriors on 13 November 2016
Largest away win — 24 points
31-6 Ospreys away to Cardiff Blues on 18 November 2016
Most points scored —  62 points (x2)
62-25 Exeter Chiefs at home to Cardiff Blues on 13 November 2016
62-10 Wasps at home to Worcester Warriors on 13 November 2016
Most tries in a match — 10 (x2)
Exeter Chiefs at home to Cardiff Blues on 13 November 2016
Wasps at home to Worcester Warriors on 13 November 2016
Most conversions in a match — 6 (x3)
Exeter Chiefs at home to Cardiff Blues on 13 November 2016
Wasps at home to Worcester Warriors on 13 November 2016
Exeter Chiefs at home to Wasps on 28 January 2017
Most penalties in a match — 4 (x2)
Harlequins at home to Exeter Chiefs on 5 November 2016
Northampton Saints away to Newcastle Falcons on 6 November 2016
Bath at home to Gloucester on 27 January 2017
Most drop goals in a match — 1
Northampton Saints away to Newcastle Falcons on 6 November 2016

Player
Most points in a match — 17 
 Joe Simmonds for Exeter Chiefs at home to Cardiff Blues on 13 November 2016
Most tries in a match — 3
 Michele Campagnaro for Exeter Chiefs at home to Wasps on 28 January 2017
Most conversions in a match — 6 (x2)
 Joe Simmonds for Exeter Chiefs at home to Cardiff Blues on 13 November 2016
 Joe Simmonds for Exeter Chiefs at home to Wasps on 28 January 2017
Most penalties in a match — 4 (x3)
 Nick Evans for Harlequins at home to Exeter Chiefs on 5 November 2016
 Sam Olver for Northampton Saints away to Newcastle Falcons on 6 November 2016
 Rhys Priestland for Bath at home to Gloucester on 27 January 2017
Most drop goals in a match — 1
 Sam Olver for Northampton Saints away to Newcastle Falcons on 6 November 2016

Attendances
Highest — 25,849
Leicester Tigers at home to Northampton Saints on 28 January 2017
Lowest — 1,370
Cardiff Blues at home to Worcester Warriors on 4 February 2017
Highest Average Attendance — 22,300
Leicester Tigers
Lowest Average Attendance — 2,732
Cardiff Blues

References

2016-17
2016–17 rugby union tournaments for clubs
2016–17 English Premiership (rugby union)
2016–17 in Welsh rugby union